Fit as a Fiddle is an album by Natalie MacMaster. It was reissued by Rounder Records in 1997.

Production
The album was produced at CBC's Studio H.

Critical reception
The Washington Post called the album "a straightforward collection of traditional Celtic fiddle tunes performed with undeniable flair and simple accompaniment."

Track listing
 "Strathspeys & Reels" – 4:20
"John Campbell's" (strathspey)
"Miss Ann Moir's Birthday" (strathspey)
"Lady Georgina Campbell" (reel)
"Angus on the Turnpike" (reel)
"Sheehan’s Reel" (reel)
 "Jigs" – 3:07
"My Dungannon Sweetheart" (jig)
"Scaffies Cairet" (jig)
"Juniper Jig" (jig)
 "March, Strathspeys & Reels" – 6:48
"Carnival March" (march)
"Miller of Drone" (strathspey)
"MacKinnon's Brook" (strathspey)
"Lucy Campbell" (strathspey)
"Annie is My Darling" (reel)
"Gordon Cote" (reel)
"Bird's Nest" (reel)
"Maid Behind the Bar" (reel)
 "Waltz" – 2:25
"Nancy's Waltz" (waltz)
 "Hornpipe & Reels" – 3:45
"Compliments to Sean Maguire" (hornpipe)
"President Garfield" (reel)
"Miss Watt" (reel)
"Casa Loma Castle" (reel)
 "Air, Strathspeys & Reels" – 7:14
"O'r the Moor Among the Heather" (air)
Traditional (strathspey)
"Lady Mary Ramsay" (strathspey)
"Jenny Dang the Weaver" (reel)
"The Lassies of Stewarton" (reel)
"Garfield Vale" (reel)
 "Reel" – 3:07
"Jean's Reel" (reel)
 "Air" – 4:20
"I'll Always Remember You" (air)
 "Reels" – 4:04
"The Girls at Martinfield" (reel)
"Bennett's Favorite" (reel)
"The Green Fields of Glentown" (reel)
 "Jigs" – 3:06
"Counselor's" (jig)
"The Rakes of Kildare" (jig)
"The Lark in the Morning" (jig)
 "Strathspeys & Reels" – 4:18
"The Lass of Carrie Mills" (strathspey)
"Lennox's Love to Blantyre" (strathspey)
"Archie Menzies" (reel)
"Reichwall Forest" (reel)
 "Air" – 3:55
"If Ever You Were Mine" (air)
 "Jig & Reels" – 3:13
"The MacNeils of Ugdale" (jig)
"MacLaine of Loch Buie" (reel)
"Colville's Rant" (reel)
"Pibroch O'Donal Dhu" (reel)

Personnel
 Natalie MacMaster – fiddle, piano (track 10), step dancing (track 7)
 David MacIsaac – acoustic and electric guitar, bass
 Howie MacDonald – piano (tracks 1, 2, 3 and 11)
 Tracey Dares – piano and synth (tracks 4, 6, 7, 9, 12 and 13)
 Tom Roach – drums and percussion
 Jamie MacInnis – highland pipes
 Sandy Moore – Celtic harp

References

 

Natalie MacMaster albums
1993 albums